Craig Lee Fuller (born July 18, 1949) is an American musician and songwriter. Fuller was the co-founder of Pure Prairie League, along with John David Call and George Powell.

Fuller wrote and sang their first hit "Amie". He departed the band in 1973 after their second album, Bustin' Out, due to draft board problems. He returned to the music business in 1976 for two LPs with American Flyer. After American Flyer dissolved, Fuller returned to record one LP with former Flyer member Eric Kaz.

In 1987 Fuller was hired by Little Feat to front the band, who had long ago noticed an uncanny resemblance in his voice to that of their late founder and frontman, Lowell George. Fuller's first LP with the band was Let It Roll.  He recorded two further albums with Little Feat before leaving the band in 1993. He made a guest appearance on their 1996 live album Live From Neon Park. He is one of several guest artists on Little Feat's 2008 album Join the Band duetting with percussionist Sam Clayton on the Lowell George classic "Spanish Moon."

Fuller reformed Pure Prairie League in 1998. This incarnation recorded one album, All In Good Time, released in 2005.

Fuller opened for and sat in with Little Feat on New Year's Eve 2011 at the Fillmore in Silver Spring, MD, when the band performed their live album Waiting For Columbus in its entirety.

Albums

with J. D. Blackfoot
The Ultimate Prophecy (1970)

with Pure Prairie League
Pure Prairie League (1972)
Bustin' Out (1972)
 Mementos (1987)
All In Good Time (2005)

with American Flyer
American Flyer (1976)
Spirit Of A Woman (1977)

with Fuller and Kaz
Craig Fuller and Eric Kaz (1978)

with Little Feat
Let It Roll (1988)
Representing The Mambo (1990)
Shake Me Up (1991)

with Doug Prescott
The Journey & the Deep Blue Sea (2011)

References

External links
Little Feat bio

1949 births
American rock singers
Living people
Little Feat members
American Flyer (band) members
Pure Prairie League members